Tafsīr al Burhān is an exegesis on the Quran written by the Zaydi Imam Abu'l-Fath an-Nasir ad-Dailami in the 11th century. The book is still in existence in manuscript. One manuscript of this commentary, entitled al-Burhān fī tafsīr al- Qurʾān, is held in the Library of the Great Mosque (al-Jāmiʿ al-Kabīr) in Sana'a and a folio called Tafsīr al-Qurʾān al-karīm is held by the Staatsbibliothek in Berlin. This commentary is in four parts, which has been said to display nuances and  subtleties of all the different disciplines of Islam. In at least one occasion al- Burhān has been titled al-Tafsīr al-kabīr.

References

Shia tafsir
Zaydi literature